Viborg and Nyslott County was a county of the Swedish Empire from 1634 to 1721. The county was named after the castle towns of Viborg and Nyslott (literally New Castle), today located in the towns of Vyborg in Russia and Savonlinna in Finland.

The county was established in 1634 as Karelia County, but in 1641 Nyslott County was broken out and made a separate entity. Remainder of Karelia County was now called Viborg County. In 1650 the counties were joined again as the Viborg and Nyslott County.

Following the Great Northern War southeastern parts of the county were ceded to Russia in 1721, and the territory that remained was reconstituted into the County of Kymmenegård and Nyslott, with the northern and western parts of County of Kexholm. In 1743 following a new conflict part of this county was also ceded to Russia in the Treaty of Åbo. The ceded parts of the County of Viborg and Nyslott and the County of Kexholm were at first part of the Saint Petersburg Governorate, but in 1744 they were reconstituted with new conquests into the Russian Vyborg Governorate, which also became known as Old Finland. Remainder of the County of Kymmenegård and Nyslott was joined with some parts of the County of Nyland and Tavastehus in 1747 into the County of Savolax and Kymmenegård.

After the Russian victory in the Finnish War in 1809, Sweden ceded all its territory in Finland to Russia by the Treaty of Fredrikshamn. As part of Russian Empire Finland became to constitute a separate grand duchy. In 1812 Russia made the territories of Vyborg Governorate part of the new Grand Duchy of Finland as Viipuri Province.

Maps

Governors

 Åke Eriksson Oxenstierna 1634–1637
 Erik Gyllenstierna 1637–1641
 Karl Mörner 1641–1644 (Viborg County)
 Johan Rosenhane 1644–1650 (Viborg County)
 Herman Fleming 1641–1645 (Nyslott County)
 Mikael von Jordan 1645–1650 (Nyslott County)
 Johan Rosenhane 1650–1655
 Axel Axelsson Stålarm 1655–1656
 Anders Koskull 1656–1657
 Erik Kruse 1657–1658
 Jakob Törnsköld 1658–1667
 Conrad Gyllenstierna 1667–1674
 Fabian Wrede 1675–1681
 Carl Falkenberg 1681–1686
 Anders Lindhielm 1689–1704
 Georg Lybecker 1705–1712

External links
Vyborg
The County of the Castle of Vyborg

See also
Fief of Viborg
Vyborg Governorate

Former counties of Sweden
Former provinces of Finland
1634 establishments in Sweden
History of Vyborg